Abdulrahman Al-Ghamdi is a Saudi Arabian football player .

External links
 
 Goal.com Profile 
 
 slstat.com Profile

1986 births
Living people
Saudi Arabian footballers
Al-Shoulla FC players
Al-Riyadh SC players
Al-Kawkab FC players
Al-Selmiyah Club players
Al-Sharq Club players
Saudi First Division League players
Saudi Professional League players
Saudi Second Division players
Saudi Fourth Division players
Association football goalkeepers